Fagg or FAGG may refer to:

Fagg (surname)
Fagg, Virginia, an unincorporated community in the US
George Airport's ICAO code
Federal Agency for Medicines and Health Products, a Belgian regulatory agency

See also
Fagge baronets
Faggs Manor, Pennsylvania, an unincorporated community in the US